Sam Robertson (born 1985) is a Scottish actor.

Sam or Samuel Robertson may also refer to:

 Sam Robertson (American football), American football coach with Southwestern Louisiana, 1980–1985
 Sam Robertson (skier), Australian alpine ski racer
 Samuel Matthews Robertson (1852–1911), American politician
 Samuel Robertson (Medal of Honor), United States Army soldier and Medal of Honor recipient

See also
 Samuel Robertson Technical Secondary School, a high school in Maple Ridge, British Columbia